Toyah Ann Willcox (born 18 May 1958) is an English musician, actress, and TV presenter. In a career spanning more than 40 years, Willcox has had eight top 40 singles, released over 20 albums, written two books, appeared in over 40 stage plays and 10 feature films, and voiced and presented numerous television shows.

Between 1977 and 1983, she fronted the band Toyah, before embarking on a solo career in the mid-1980s. At the 1982 Brit Awards, Toyah was nominated for British Breakthrough Act, and Best Female Solo Artist. Toyah was nominated a further two times in this category in 1983, and in 1984. Her hit singles include "It's a Mystery", "Thunder in the Mountains" and "I Want to Be Free".

Childhood and early life
Willcox was born on 18 May 1958 in Kings Heath, Birmingham. Her father Beric Willcox ran a successful joinery business and owned three factories. Her mother Barbara Joy, née Rollinson, was a professional dancer, with whom he fell in love after seeing her on stage in Weston-super-Mare with singing and comedy double act Flanagan and Allen, and married in 1949. Barbara had to give up her career after giving birth to Nicola (born 1950) and Kim (born 1953), Willcox's elder sister and brother, respectively.

Willcox has suggested her first name could be in reference to Toyah, Texas or to a Native American word "toyah" meaning "water," although she notes her parents deny both origins.

Willcox enjoyed a financially comfortable childhood, attending a private girls' school, but was bullied. Requiring physiotherapy for a spinal condition, she behaved violently towards her mother, to whom she was close. An absentee pupil and frequently rebellious, she sat O-levels a year late, owing to corrective surgery on her feet. She achieved one O-level pass, in music. Alienated by her background and surroundings, her rebellious behaviour led to her shunning male company and adopting an aggressive and flamboyant identity.

Her early interest in music, dance and acting, combined with her alienation, and her uncertainty regarding her sexuality, led Willcox to seek an outlet, initially in acting and then in music. She attended the Old Rep Drama School in Birmingham, paying privately because she was denied a grant, the assessor noting: "She has a lisp and isn't attractive." She began working as a dresser in local theatres, including The Alexandra, Birmingham, and the Birmingham Hippodrome. Because of her distinctive appearance and gaudily dyed hair, repertory actors referred to her as "The Bird of Paradise."

A friend's suggestion that she should see the Sex Pistols led to her being attracted to the punk movement, but she resolved to do better, travelling to London to take up a career in acting and music.

Move to London
After appearing as an extra in a drama being made at the BBC Pebble Mill Studios in Birmingham, an opening came to take a role in Glitter (1976), a play in the BBC Second City Firsts series, alongside Noel Edmonds and Phil Daniels. Recommended to the play's director by a member of the wardrobe department because of her distinctive appearance and oddball character, Willcox was given the role of Sue, a girl who sang with the band Bilbo and who dreamed of appearing on Top of the Pops. In the course of the 30-minute play, Willcox performed two songs she had co-written: "Floating Free" (an acoustic ballad, with Phil Daniels accompanying her on guitar) and "Dream Maker". The play was seen by Kate Nelligan and Maximilian Schell, who offered her work with the National Theatre in London, where she got the part of Emma in Tales from the Vienna Woods, directed by Schell. The opening led to her relocating to London.

In 1977, while playing Emma in Tales from the Vienna Woods at the National Theatre, Willcox, inspired by her role as a musician in Glitter, fronted a band called Toyah which featured Joel Bogen on guitar, Mark Henry on bass, Steve Bray on drums, Peter Bush on keyboards, and herself on vocals. Having never considered herself a musician, she found herself fronting a successful band, although still uncertain about her own sexuality and repelled by her bandmates' antics with groupies.

Introduced by actor Ian Charleson to director Derek Jarman, Willcox was offered 'any part you want' in Jubilee (called Down with the Queen at the time). Plagued by budgetary issues, the film featured Willcox as the murderous 'Mad', as well as a number of other prominent figures from the punk scene. She went on to play 'Monkey' in the 1979 film of The Who's Quadrophenia, having been introduced to director Franc Roddam through an association with John Lydon. Willcox demanded the part of Monkey from Roddam. She completed filming despite requiring medical attention for pneumonia.

The possibility of a role in the Sex Pistols' film, The Great Rock 'n' Roll Swindle under director Russ Meyer having fallen through, Willcox went on to play Miranda in Jarman's film The Tempest which won her a nomination as Best Newcomer at the 1980 Evening Standard Awards.  Continuing a stage career alongside film work, in 1979, on London's Royal Court Theatre stage, Willcox played Sharon in Nigel Williams' Sugar and Spice, Tallulah in Stephen Poliakoff's American Days at the ICA, playing alongside Mel Smith, Antony Sher and Phil Daniels and taking a film role opposite Katharine Hepburn in the made-for-television film The Corn Is Green, directed by George Cukor.

Willcox found her dual careers as a musician and actress frequently in conflict, leading to confusion as to which role constituted a 'compartment' to put her into. Feeling her musical career was not taken as seriously as her acting, she nevertheless viewed her acting role as 'highbrow' and her musical career as 'lowbrow'.

Acting career
Willcox played Calamity Jane at the Shaftesbury Theatre and was a guest vocalist in the anniversary concert of The Rocky Horror Show at the Royal Court Theatre. She had many television roles, including series such as Quatermass (1979) and Minder. She starred opposite Laurence Olivier in The Ebony Tower (1984) and opposite the Who's Roger Daltrey in Murder: Ultimate Grounds for Divorce (1984). She also appeared on Kavanagh QC and Secret Diary of a Call Girl. During the late 1980s and 1990s, Willcox forged ahead with a career as a stage performer. Notable credits include Trafford Tanzi (at the Mermaid Theatre, leading role), Cabaret (Sally Bowles), Three Men on a Horse (winner of an Laurence Olivier Awards for Best New Comedy), and the UK tour of Arthur Smith's Live Bed Show. In 1990, she played Costanza in the national tour of Amadeus.

Although she had presented the magazine series Look! Hear! for BBC Birmingham between 1979 and 1981, it was in the 1990s that Toyah's career as a TV presenter took off. She began by presenting arts programmes First Night and Time Off in 1993. By the mid to late 1990s, Toyah could be seen presenting items on shows such as Watchdog:healthcheck, This Morning and The Heaven and Earth Show. She also worked on VH1 for three years, presenting Toyah and Toyah and Chase for the cable music station. Viewers could accompany Toyah to various locations worldwide during her tenure as a reporter on BBC travel shows such as Holiday and Holiday- Fasten Your Seatbelts. In 1996, Toyah had the unique honour of simultaneously hosting both Songs of Praise on the BBC and Good Sex Guide Late on ITV. At the turn of the millennium, Toyah continued to work on The Heaven and Earth Show as a newspaper reviewer and also presented a series of Whose Recipe Is It Anyway on the Carlton Food Network and 40 episodes of Beyond Medicine on the Discovery Health Channel. As the noughties progressed, Toyah had stints presenting Head2Head and Destination Lunch on the Overseas Property TV channel, was a newspaper reviewer on Sky News, hosted various music programmes for Vintage TV and was a guest presenter on Loose Women in 2007.

In 1999, she took the lead in the children's television series Barmy Aunt Boomerang. She also provided the voices for the children's television programmes Teletubbies and Brum. She has also appeared in the reality television series I'm a Celebrity...Get Me Out of Here! and I'm Famous and Frightened!. In December 2018, she won her heat of Celebrity Mastermind.

In the 2000s, Willcox had a busy schedule with theatre commitments, including appearing on stage in London's West End performing the title role of Calamity Jane (nominated for an Evening Standard Award for Best Musical) at the Shaftesbury Theatre in 2003. In June 2008, Willcox appeared on Living with the Dead on Living to share her experiences of living in her haunted home. On 24 July 2008, Willcox appeared on UK ITV1's This Morning to discuss her role as a vampire in the rock musical Vampires Rock. Toyah has also appeared in shows looking back on popular culture, including the I'm a Celebrity series, and various 'Top 100 favourite' shows. More recently, Willcox played Queen Ivannah in Snow White and the Seven Dwarfs at the Lyceum in Sheffield for the 2009 Christmas season. In October 2009, she made a guest appearance in the BBC drama series Casualty. Willcox has also been heard on radio, including the 2002 BBC Radio 4 series The Further Adventures of Sherlock Holmes. She is also played the widow Fantine in Focus on the Family radio theatre's version of Les Misérables. In December 2006, she joined the radio drama series Silver Street on the BBC Asian Network as Siobhan Brady. In November 2017, she played Queen Elizabeth II in a theatre adaptation of Derek Jarman's film Jubilee at Manchester Royal Exchange Theatre. This production transferred to the Lyric Hammersmith for a London run in March 2018.

In recent years, there has been renewed interest in Toyah as a film actress, as she has appeared in a number of British films. These include: Aaaaaaaah!, Extremis, Lies We Tell, SwipeRight, Hound, Heckle and Invasion Planet Earth.

Musical career
In London, Willcox lived in a place called "Mayhem", a converted British Rail warehouse serving as a studio. It was here the band Toyah recorded their first demos. For the lack of proper bed she slept for a while in a "second-hand" coffin, reportedly used by the French Red Cross to transport victims of fatal accidents. Citing her role in Quadrophenia as a boost to her musical career, with growing audiences Toyah signed to Safari Records, releasing a debut single "Victims of the Riddle", which topped the UK Indie Chart. This was followed by the Sheep Farming in Barnet EP, produced by Steve James and Keith Hale. Initially released in Germany, in 1979 it was re-released as an LP, comprising the original six tracks, "Victims of the Riddle" A and B sides and three tracks that were previously unavailable on vinyl. Willcox's second album, The Blue Meaning, went to no. 40 in the UK Albums Chart in June 1980. By this time she is reported as announcing she had severed all ties with punk aesthetics.

In January 1981, the live album Toyah! Toyah! Toyah!, recorded at the Lafayette Club in Wolverhampton the previous June, made it to the Top 30, backed up by a TV documentary Toyah. By now the original band had broken up and a new lineup was in place, consisting of Phil Spalding, Nigel Glockler and Adrian Lee, only Joel Bogen remaining and Toyah. 1981 saw Willcox's strengthened presence in the UK chart with hits such as Four from Toyah EP (no. 4, February 1981, including "It's a Mystery"), the third studio album Anthem that went to no. 2 in May 1981, to be later certified platinum, "I Want to Be Free" (no. 8, June 1981), "Thunder in the Mountains" (no. 4, October 1981) and Four More from Toyah EP (no. 14, November 1981). She became one of the first acts to score regularly in the UK Singles Chart with EPs, which were also successful on an international level. At the end of the year Willcox won the Smash Hits''' reader's poll in two categories: Best Female Singer and Most Fanciable Female (beating Kim Wilde to the second place). In 1981 she alone, according to Safari, sold in the UK more units than the whole of the Warner Bros. put together.

In 1982 The Changeling album was released, produced by Steve Lillywhite, marking a turn for a more goth-tinged sound, it went up to no. 6 in the UK. The Changeling was followed in the same year by a double live album Warrior Rock: Toyah on Tour. Also in 1982, Willcox appeared in Urgh! A Music War, a British film released in 1982 featuring performances by punk rock, new wave, and post-punk acts, filmed in 1980, in which she performed "Danced". Three more of her singles, "Brave New World", "Ieya" and "Be Proud Be Loud (Be Heard)" charted in the Top 50 of the UK Singles Chart.

The making of Love Is the Law (1983) was the happiest period of her life, according to Willcox, combining work in the critically acclaimed stage play Trafford Tanzi and the film The Ebony Tower with Laurence Olivier with work on the album. By this time, though, her popularity started to decline: the album reached no. 28 (with singles "Rebel Run" and "The Vow" peaking at no. 24 and no. 50 respectively), and with a 1984 greatest hits compilation, released by K-tel and called confusingly Toyah! Toyah! Toyah! All the Hits, failing to chart.

Toyah Willcox disbanded her group, signed a recording contract with Portrait Records, and in 1985 released the solo studio album Minx, which contained several cover versions including Alice Cooper's "School's Out", as well as her own hit, "Don't Fall in Love (I Said)".

Willcox married British guitarist Robert Fripp, founding member of King Crimson, in Poole, Dorset on his 40th birthday (16 May 1986). Together they formed a new band, called Fripp Fripp on the initial tours, later changing its name to Sunday All Over the World which released the critically acclaimed album Kneeling at the Shrine (1991). She referred to Fripp as her 'soulmate'. That same year she also sang lead vocals on the track "Lion of Symmetry" by Tony Banks of Genesis. Her next solo studio album Desire (1987) was less successful although the single with her version of "Echo Beach" made it to the  Top 50. Then in 1988 Prostitute came out, an album through which Willcox vented her frustrations which started to accumulate as a result of having made the transformation "from all-powerful artist to invisible woman" in the course of just one year of marriage. This experimental concept album, marking a considerable divergence from previous works, was released on E.G. Records. The attitude to Prostitute, according to Willcox, in the UK and the US was radically different: "In the UK, when my management tried to sell it to the music reps, an awful lot got up and walked out of meetings; all male I hasten to add. In America, Billboard magazine said it was the dawning of a new era for me as a producer and that it was an antidote to Madonna. I started to receive mail from professors at eminent universities telling me they played the album at their lectures as an example of the new way of thinking coming from contemporary women." Robert Fripp joined his wife on her studio album Ophelia's Shadow (1991) which, along with Dreamchild (1994), received good reviews. In 1996, Willcox released The Acoustic Album on Aardvark Records, featuring strings from Royal Philharmonic Orchestra and produced by Oliver Davis.

Later career

In 2001, Willcox was awarded an honorary doctorate by the University of Central England in recognition of her achievements in performing arts, media and broadcasting. The 2001 May issue of Q magazine named Willcox number 48 in their top 100 Greatest Women in Music poll, as voted for by readers of the magazine. She returned to music in 2002 with new material for a limited edition Little Tears of Love EP and a one-off preview concert at Ronnie Scott's Jazz Club. The same year she sold out eleven stadium gigs for the Here and Now tour. She continued to perform with her band, releasing a mini-album Velvet Lined Shell in 2003 on her own record label, Vertical Species Records, showcasing a darker, edgier direction. In 2004 she performed as part of The Best of the 80s tour in the UK alongside Nick Heyward, Curiosity Killed the Cat and Altered Images. A live DVD followed in 2005, the year that also saw two parts of The Safari Records Singles Collection being issued.

In May 2007, she collaborated with Bill Rieflin as the Humans for live dates in Estonia, to where she had been invited by the Estonian president. According to The Northern Echo, that resulted "from reading one of her husband's emails". The invitation was for him to go but he was not keen, so Willcox accepted. Also in 2007, Willcox signed a new worldwide publishing deal with Zomba Music Group. She continued to write and record solo material with long-term collaborator Simon Darlow. On 29 October 2007, a new single Latex Messiah (Viva la Rebel in You), came out, followed by the In the Court of the Crimson Queen album, written and produced in collaboration with Darlow and released by Willow Recordings Ltd. on 15 September 2008. As part of Liverpool's European Capital of Culture year, she performed for the first time ever at the newly opened Liverpool Echo Arena and Conference Centre.

In 2009, a new version of Vampires Rock was created, called Vampires Rock Christmas, and Willcox was back in her role as the Killer Queen, alongside the writer and one of the stars of the show, Steve Steinman. Willcox continued to perform with The Humans, featuring Bill Reiflin, Chris Wong and occasionally husband Robert Fripp. Described as "European experimental meets West Coast American grunge", the Humans recorded their debut studio album We Are the Humans in Seattle in 2008, released in Estonia in May 2009 to coincide with the band's return to play in front of the country's president. The album received a UK digital release in September 2009, along with a single "These Boots Are Made for Walkin'". At the end of the year Willcox came seventh in a BBC series naming the "Queens of British Pop", as voted for by the British public. In 2010 Willcox with the Humans performed at the London's Roundhouse Haiti earthquake fundraiser concert. On 17 June 2011, Willcox commenced on a special from Sheep Farming to Anthem tour, celebrating the 30th anniversary of her breakthrough hit "It's a Mystery" and the platinum-selling album Anthem, starting at the London's Leicester Square Theatre. The set included selections drawn exclusively from Toyah's first three albums, Sheep Farming in Barnet (1979), The Blue Meaning (1980) and Anthem (1981). Andi Fraggs, a British electronic musician, supported her on chosen dates.

On 14 April 2012, Willcox launched the Changeling Resurrection 2012 tour at the Concorde 2 in Brighton to celebrate the 30th anniversary of her album The Changeling (1982). On 16 July 2012, Willcox performed a concert in her birthplace of Kings Heath, Birmingham, to celebrate being the first artist with a star on the King's Heath Walk of Fame. Andi Fraggs made a surprise appearance, duetting Willcox's 1981 hit single "Thunder in the Mountains". In 2013, Willcox released a deluxe edition of her 2008 album In the Court of the Crimson Queen and embarked on the tour revisiting the Love Is the Law (1983)-era material.

Willcox continued to tour both with her full band and also with an acoustic line-up for her "Up Close and Personal" shows.

In 2018, Willcox toured her #Toyah60 show, which marked her sixtieth birthday and fortieth year in music. This was accompanied by the release of her Four from Toyah- Birthday Edition EP of new material, which charted highly in the digital chart.

In 2019, Willcox charted at no. 74 in the UK Albums Chart with a re-issue of her 2008 album In the Court of the Crimson Queen. It also peaked at no. 22 on the Official Charts Company's sales chart and no. 7 in the independent chart. This was Willcox' first appearance in the UK Albums Chart since Minx in 1985.

In 2020 the box set Toyah Solo was released, containing six solo albums with bonus material, one Rare, Remixed and Revisited CD, and a DVD with promo videos and interviews.

In 2020, following their acquisition of the Toyah Safari catalogue, Cherry Red Records began reissuing Toyah's early albums in deluxe 2CD/DVD and vinyl formats. Both Sheep Farming in Barnet and Blue Meaning have been reissued, both appearing in the UK Albums Chart.

During the first UK lockdown of 2020, Toyah began broadcasting from her home across social media and YouTube. On Saturdays she answers fan questions and shares archive performances in Toyah at Home and co-hosts Agony Aunts alongside her husband Robert Fripp. However, it is her Sunday Lunch series with Fripp that has garnered the most notoriety, frequently going viral and racking up millions of hits on YouTube.

She released Posh Pop, her first solo studio album since 2008, on CD and vinyl via DMG on 27 August 2021, with the album featuring 10 tracks composed by Toyah and "Slave to the Rhythm" co-writer Simon Darlow. The album reached no. 22 in the chart.

Alongside Fripp, Toyah continued with their Sunday Lunch online series. Recent editions of Willcox and Fripp’s weekly covers series – which they launched amid COVID-19 lockdowns in 2020 – have included their take on Slipknot's "Psychosocial", Billy Idol's "Rebel Yell", Rammstein's "Keine Lust", Foo Fighters' "All My Life", Grace Jones' "Slave to the Rhythm" and Rage Against the Machine's "Killing in the Name". On 12 August 2022, they released "Slave to the Rhythm" as a digital download and streaming single. 

In August 2022, she appeared as herself in two episodes of the BBC Radio 4 series The Archers.

Toyah will be joining Billy Idol on his UK live dates this October on The Roadside Tour 2022, alongside special guests, Killing Joke.

Personal life
She has been married since 1986 to musician Robert Fripp, founder and guitarist of the progressive rock group King Crimson. The couple have no children and have arranged their wills so as to leave their estates to the establishment of a musical educational trust for children.

In 1987, Willcox was invited to make a speech at the Women of the Year ceremony in the presence of Diana, Princess of Wales, expressing her views on the subject of how being disabled incites creativity and craving for a fuller life experience.

In 2002, she became a prominent opponent of planned accommodation centres for asylum seekers near the Worcestershire village of Throckmorton, protesting together with more than one thousand villagers.

In November 2007, Willcox took on the role of sponsoring the Black Country Urban Park for the People's £50 million Big Lottery Fund. In April 2008, she took part in the Great Walk to Beijing alongside other celebrities, to raise money for Olivia Newton-John's cancer charity.

Discography

 Sheep Farming in Barnet (1980)
 The Blue Meaning (1980)
 Anthem (1981)
 The Changeling (1982)
 Love Is the Law (1983)
 Minx (1985)
 Desire (1987)
 Prostitute (1988)
 Ophelia's Shadow (1991)
 Take the Leap! (1993)
 Dreamchild (1994)
 Looking Back (1995)
 The Acoustic Album (1996)
 Velvet Lined Shell (2003)
 In the Court of the Crimson Queen (2008)
 Posh Pop (2021)

Tours 
 1979: The Resurrection Tour
 1979: Sheep Farming in Barnet Tour
 1980: Bird in Flight Tour
 1980: Ieya Tour
 1981: College Tour
 1981: Anthem Tour
 1981: Good Morning Universe: European Tour
 1982: Changeling Tour
 1982: Mini Tour
 1983: Rebel Run Tour
 1988: Fripp Fripp Tour
 1989: Sunday All Over the World Tour
 1993: Take the Leap! Tour
 1994: Leap 2 Dream Tour
 1994: Acoustic Dreamchild Tour
 1994: Has God Ceased 2 Dream You? Tour
 2002: Here and Now Tour
 2004: Best of the 80s Tour
 2006: The Hitmakers Tour
 2010: From Sheep Farming to Anthem: Classics Revisited Tour
 2012: The Changeling Resurrection Tour
 2012: The Changeling Resurrection II
 2013: Love Is the Law & More Tour
 2014: Crimson Queen/Greatest Hits... Live!
 2014: Acoustic, Up Close & Personal
 2014: North American Tour (with The Humans)
 2014: Songs From The Intergalactic Ranch House... and Beyond!
 2015: Loud, Proud & Electric Tour
 2017: 80s Invasion Tour
 2018: #Toyah60 Tour
 2019: Thunder in the Highlands Scottish Tour
 2021/22: Posh Pop Tour
 2022: Electric Ladies with Hazel O'Connor

Filmography

Feature films
 1978: Jubilee as Mad
 1979: The Corn Is Green as Bessie Watty
 1979: The Tempest as Miranda
 1979: Quadrophenia as Monkey
 1981: Urgh! A Music War as herself
 1984: Murder: Ultimate Grounds for Divorce as Valerie Cunningham
 1984: The Ebony Tower as Anne, 'The Freak'
 1993: Anchoress as Pauline Carpenter
 1999: Julie and the Cadillacs as Barbara Gifford
 1999: The Most Fertile Man in Ireland as Dr. Johnson
 2011: The Power of Three as Michelle
 2015: Aaaaaaaah!
 2017: The Last Laugh
 2017: Lies We Tell
 2017: In Extremis
 2017: The Apple Picker
 2018: Hound
 2019: Heckle
 2019: Invasion Planet Earth
 2020: To Be Someone (post-production)
 2020: SwipeRight (post-production)
 2020: Doll House (in production)
 2020: Give Them Wings as Alice Hodgson
 2021: Ghosts of Borley Rectory as Estelle Roberts

TV appearances
 1976: Second City Firsts as Sue
 1977: Three Piece Suite as Buzz – This Situation
 1978: Premier as Fran
 1979: The Quatermass Conclusion as Sal
 1980: Shoestring as Toola
 1980: A Question of Guilt as Alice Fulcher
 1980: Minder
 1982: ITV Playhouse as Sheryl
 1982: Animal Magic as herself
 1982: Dear Heart as Super Advice Person
 1982: Tales of the Unexpected as Myra, known as Marigold
 1984: Pop Quiz – Christmas Special
 1985: Function Room
 1985: Pob as herself
 1987: The Grand Knockout Tournament as herself
 1988: French and Saunders as herself
 1988: Boudicca
 1990: Cluedo as Miss Scarlet
 1990: The Tale of Little Pig Robinson as Ship's Cat
 1991–1994: Brum as Narrator
 1992 Hairy Jeremy as Narrator
 1992: First Night on TV – hosting
 1993: Maigret as Gigi
 1993: Doctor Who: Thirty Years in the TARDIS as herself
 1994: The Ink Thief
 1995: Kavanagh QC
 1995: The Shooting Gallery
 1996: Good Sex Guide Late
 1997: Presenting... Toyah on VH1
 1997: Light Lunch
 1997–2001: Teletubbies as Narrator (opening and closing)
 1998: Boys from the Black Country – The Slade Story – hosting
 1998–2005: Never Mind the Buzzcocks
 1999: It's Slade
 1999: Barmy Aunt Boomerang
 2000: Doctors as Marcy Preston
 2002: Mr Bean: The Animated Series Additional Voices
 2002: Rock Legends as herself
 2002: Open House Panto Special
 2005: QueenMania
 2006: Proud Parents as herself
 2007–2008: Secret Diary of a Call Girl
 2007: Loose Women – One Time Panellist
 2008: In Your Dreams as herself
 2008: Living with the Dead
 2008: Celebrity Mastermind
 2008: Ready Steady Cook – Celebrity Christmas Special as herself
 1982: FM (TV series) as Herself
 2009: Psychic Therapy as herself
 2009: Celeb Experiences as herself
 2009: Hole in the Wall as herself
 2009: Celebrity Brides Unveiled as herself
 2009: Celebrity Life Skills as herself
 2009: The One Show
 2009: Casualty
 2010: Greatest Christmas TV Moments  (TV Movie documentary)
 2010: Gayle Tuesday: The Comeback 
 2010: Greatest Christmas TV Ads  (TV Movie documentary)
 2011: Celebrity Ghost Stories
 2012: The Women of Doctor Who (TV Movie documentary)
 2012: Doctor Who: Best of Specials (TV Mini-Series documentary)
 2013: The Big Fat Quiz of the 80s (TV Movie)
 2013: All Star Mr & Mrs
 2013: 3 Sides of the Coin (Short)
 2013: The Power of Three
 2013: Dun Punkin: Ep.1 – 'Boys Will Be Boys' (Short)
 2014: Splash!
 2014: Pointless
 2014: Who's Doing the Dishes?
 2015: Doctors as Bill
 2016: The Chase Celebrity Special
 2018: Celebrity Mastermind as herself
 2020: Celebrity Catchphrase
 2021: Pointless Celebrities
 2021: Celebrity Tipping Point
 2021: Britain's Biggest 80s Hits (also known as The 80s Greatest Hits) various episodes as herself (talking head contributor)
 2021: Britain's Biggest 70s Hits (later years) as herself (talking head/punk-era expert)
 2022: Fame in the Family

Books
 2000: Living Out Loud
 2005: Diary of a Facelift

Sources

General

References

External links

 
 
 
 
 

1958 births
20th-century English singers
21st-century English singers
E.G. Records artists
English new wave musicians
English stage actresses
English television actresses
Women new wave singers
Living people
Musicians from Birmingham, West Midlands
Musicians from Worcestershire
People from Pershore
English women pop singers
English film actresses
Toyah (band) members
I'm a Celebrity...Get Me Out of Here! (British TV series) participants